Peninsular Gneiss or Peninsular Gniessic Complex are the gneissic complex of the metamorphics found all over the Indian Peninsula, on top of which, the supra-crustal Dharwar System have been laid down. The term was first fashioned by W.F.Smeeth of the Mysore Geological Department in 1916 based on the first scientific study of this rock exposure. One of the best exposures of this rock mass, dated 2.5 to 3.4 billion years, is located at Lal Bagh in Bangalore.
The exposure is also called the Lalbagh rock.

Geology

The Archean gneisses and schists, which are the oldest rocks of the Indian Shield, constitute a considerable area of Peninsular India. The Dharwar (Super Group) and the Peninsular Gneissic Complex are the classified  groups of the Precambrian rocks of India. The extent of the Archean system is depicted as the dominant system of South India in the pictured Geological Map of India.

In most stratigraphic schemes, the peninsular gneisses are shown as the younger Archaean strata situated above the Sargur Group. Granitization of the older sedimentary–volcogenic sequence are reported as sources of the peninsular gneisses made up  of polyphase migmatites, gneisses and granites ranging in composition from granodiorite to tonalite.

The rocks of the Dharwar Group, which are mainly sedimentary in origin, occur in narrow elongated synclines resting on the gneisses found in Bellary district, Mysore and the Aravallis of Rajputana.

The supracrustal rocks of the Dharwar Group of the southern Indian Peninsula, as depicted in the geological map of South India, have the Peninsular Gneiss as the basement rock formation, also stated to be the remobilized basement. Migmatization of pre-existing metasedimentary and meta–igneous rocks are considered the contributors to formation of the composite gneiss.

Geology of the Lalbagh hill monument

The Lalbagh hill, which has been declared as a Geological Monument (plaque pictured) to represent the Peninsular Gneiss, has dark biolite gneiss of granitic to granodioritic composition containing streaks of biolite. Remnants of older rocks are seen in the form of enclaves. The research information of the geological record of the gneisses, collated and reported in the publication "Geological Monuments of India" published by the Geological Survey of India, is quoted below to provide an undiluted version.A common enclave is a dark grey to black rock called amphibolite containing the minerals plagioclase feldspar and hornblende. Due to interactions with granite fluids, these enclaves have developed a border rich in biotite mica. Later magmatic activity represented by grey poryphiritic granite followed by pink massive granite is also seen at several places. The gneisses and granites have been profusely invaded by still younger veins of coarse grained pegmatite which have cut up the gneisses into several irregular and lenticular shapes.. The earliest rock was a dark coloured amphibolite which was converted into grey biotite gneiss during migmatization. The grey biotite gneiss during migmatization was first intruded by grey porphyritic granite and later by pink granites. Pegamatities of several generations have traversed all these rocks.

Geological age
Initial studies on the Gneiss samples of the Lalbagh hill and other locations in Bengaluru, carried out in the early 1970s, have attributed two major events of 2.9 –3.0 Ga and 2.5 Ga −2.6 Ga for development of the Peninsular Gneisses of Bengaluru. Recent studies carried out with precision techniques indicate that the gneisses have accreted in the following major episodes.

Thus, three major episodes, namely, 3.4 Ga., 3.3–3.2 Ga., and 3.0–2.9 Ga., are accreted to form the Peninsular Gneiss of the region, dated 2500 to 3400 million years.

The Sargur schist belts within the Peninsular Gneiss could be the oldest suture zones in the Indian subcontinent.

Lalbagh

Lalbagh established by Hyder Ali based on Mughal Gardens at Sira is not only a famous botanical garden but has also a historical link. The creation of the Bengaluru city in the 16th century is attributed to Kempegowda, the then feudal leader under the feudatory of the Vijayanagara empire, who established four cardinal towers setting limits to the growth of the city.  One of the towers at the southern end of the city is the Lalbagh tower erected over the Lalbagh hill which is made up of Peninsular Gneiss, now identified as a National Geological Monument. The city has outgrown the limits set by Kempegowda many times and is now part of the downtown area.
The topographic setting of the Lalbagh rock, from a layman's interest, is that in the western and northern directions it slopes steeply while it merges gently with soil in the east and south. View from the North is impressive since the rock has retained its original form. The west or north–west view is panoramic and aesthetic, with grayish–white clean plates like appearance (see picture). The rock shines white after the rains and attracts attention of the visitors who excitedly climb the rock mass to the tower at the top to get a panoramic view of the gardens and the city.

Access

The monument, located in the southern part of Bengaluru,  from the Legislature office complex of the Karnataka Government (Vidhana Soudha) within the Lalbagh gardens is easily approachable by road (Metro Map of the city in the Info box gives exact location). Bengaluru is well connected by road, rail and air with the rest of the country and is also well known internationally.

Gallery

References

External links

Locations Map of the 26 Nartional Geological Monuments of India
 Trans. Min. Geology Institute India, 1, 47 (1906).
 Rec. Geology Survey India, 69, 109 and 458 (1935).
 Mem. Geology Survey India, 70 (1936 and 1940).
 Explanatory brochure on Geological and Mineral Map of Karnataka and Goa Aug 1981

History of Bangalore
Tourist attractions in Karnataka
Tourist attractions in Bangalore
Geography of Karnataka
Gneiss
Geology of India
Archean
National Geological Monuments in India